Caesars Palace is a casino and luxury hotel in the Las Vegas Strip of Paradise, Nevada. Its name, or a variation of its name, is given to the following casinos:

Caesars Atlantic City in Atlantic City, New Jersey
Caesars Windsor in Windsor, Ontario
Caesars Palace at Sea by Crystal Cruises
 
Other uses:
Caesars Casino Online
Caesar (band), a Dutch indie rock trio from Amsterdam
Caesars (band), a Swedish indie rock band from Sweden

sv:Caesar's Palace